Joseph Park Babcock (1893 – 1949), American popularizer of Mahjong, was born in Lafayette, Indiana.  After  graduating from Purdue University with a degree in Civil Engineering, he worked for the Standard Oil Company.  In 1912 he was sent to Suzhou, China, as a representative of Standard Oil.  There he and his wife enjoyed playing the Chinese tile game.  He created a simplified version of Mahjong with a goal of introducing the game to America.  He trademarked the spelling "Mah-Jongg" which he apparently coined. His Rules of Mah-Jongg, or the red book, (1920) was used as a rule book for English language players.

The game quickly became popular, but several versions were played.  In 1924, the Standardization Committee of the American Official Laws of Mah-Jongg was formed.  Babcock was an integral member, and the committee published a standardized rule set.  Many game sets were then produced in the United States by several companies.

Babcock died in New York City of a heart attack in 1949.

Works on Mah-Jongg

Notes

References
 Mah Jong Museum

1893 births
1949 deaths
Mahjong
20th-century American non-fiction writers
Purdue University alumni